Nazim Panipati (1920 – 18 June 1998) was a film song lyricist and a film script writer  of Indian and Pakistani film Industry during the 1940s and 1950s. He was born in 1920 in  Lahore. He was a brother of filmmaker Mohammad Walli (known as Walli Sahib).

New talent introductions
Nazim Panipati wrote more than two hundred songs for Hindi, Urdu and Punjabi language films. Indian singer Lata Mangeshkar recorded the first song of her career 'Dil Mera Tora, Mujhe Kahin Ka Na Chora Tere Pyar Ne', music by Ghulam Haider for the film Majboor (1948 film), was also written by Nazim Panipati. This song became popular throughout India. At that time, Master Ghulam Haider had told Nazim Panipati that this unknown girl (Lata Mangeshkar) was destined to become a great singer of India after Noor Jehan.

In 1939, Nazim Panipati and his film producer/director brother Walli Sahib first persuaded Pran to become a film actor in Lahore, due to his good looks, after Walli Sahib spotted him at Lakshmi Chowk, Lahore at a Paan Shop. Pran was reluctant and disbelieving, at first, at the offer. Pran (birth name was Pran Krishan Sikand, born in Delhi in a Hindu Punjabi family) could not speak proper Punjabi language at that time because he was raised in Delhi where his father worked. Walli Sahib was offering him to act in a Punjabi film Yamla Jat (1940). So Pran's Punjabi-language skills were polished up by Walli Sahib's songwriter brother Nazim Panipati. Pran went on to become a big film star.

Nazim Panipati also introduced Vyjayanthimala (she was from South India, Nazim Panipati taught her Urdu language for films), Johnny Walker and Helen to the Indian Film Industry.

Career in Pakistan
In 1953, Nazim Panipati migrated to Pakistan. Film Guddi Gudda (1956) was his first Pakistani film which was produced and directed by his brother Walli Sahib. Famous Pakistani film playback singer Saleem Raza and Nazim Panipati also had both worked together at an advertising agency in Lahore for some time. In the mid 1960s, he joined Pakistan Television Corporation and wrote songs for a musical programme named Jhankar.

Death
Nazim Panipati died on 18 June 1998 in Lahore, Pakistan. He was buried in the Model Town, Lahore graveyard.

Notable films
Nazim Panipati's major films as a songwriter are:
 Yamla Jat (1940) - actor Pran's debut film
 Dulla Bhatti (1940)
 Khazanchi (1941)
 Khandan (1942)
 Mangti (1942)- A Punjabi language film
 Zamindar (1942)
 Naukar (1943 film)
 Poonji (1943)
 Shirin Farhad (1945)
 Doli (1947)
 Majboor (1948)
 Roomal (1949)
 Sheesh Mahal (1950)
 Zamane Ki Hawa (1952)
 Danka (1954)
 Lakht-E-Jigar (1956)- A Pakistani film
 Guddi Gudda (1956)- A Pakistani film in the Punjabi language
 Aaina (1966 film)
 Insaniyat (1967 film)

Notable songs
Popular songs of Nazim Panipati as a lyricist:
 Aai Hai Diiwaalii Sakhi Aai Sakhi Aai Re- film Sheesh Mahal (1950) music : Vasant Desai Dil Mera Tora, Mujhe Kahin Ka Na Chora Tere Pyar Ne- film Majboor (1948)  music by Ghulam Haider 
 Dilli Ki Galiyon Mein- film Doli (1947) music by Ghulam Mohammad
 Ham Hain Dukhiya Is Duniya mein... Koi Jaage Koi Soey- film Jag Biti (1946) music by Ghulam Haider
 Merii Mitti Ki Duniya Nirali- film Sham Savera (1946) music by  Amar Nath (aka Pandit Amarnath)
 Suno Suno Kaise Kah Doon Bajariyaa Ke Beech- film Ladli (1949) music by Anil Biswas Wo Akhiyan Mila Kar Chale Gaye- film Roomal (1949) music by Hansraj Behl
 Aahen Tadap Rahi Hain, Haath Badhaae Chand Ko- film Lakht-e-Jigar (1956) music by Ghulam Ahmed Chishti
 Chanda Ki Nagri Se Aaja Ri Nindiya- a popular 'lori' song from film Lakht-e-Jigar'' (1956) music by Ghulam Ahmed Chishti

References

External links
 Songs of Nazim Panipati as a lyricist - Smriti.com
 Filmography of Nazim Panipati on cinestaan.com website

1920 births
1998 deaths
Indian lyricists
Pakistani lyricists
Pakistani songwriters
Pakistani screenwriters
Urdu-language lyricists
Hindi-language lyricists
Punjabi-language lyricists
20th-century Pakistani poets
Poets from Lahore
20th-century screenwriters
People from Panipat